Pirkko Anneli Ruohonen-Lerner (born 6 February 1957) is a Finnish politician and Member of the European Parliament (MEP) from Finland. She is a member of the Finns Party, part of the European Conservatives and Reformists.

She was elected to Finnish Parliament in 2007 and served as a member of parliament until 2015. She was the chair of the party's parliamentary group from 2011 to 2014. In April 2015, Ruohonen-Lerner succeeded Sampo Terho in the European Parliament when Terho was elected to the Parliament of Finland.

In her political career, she has served as a member of the council of the municipality of Myrskylä from 1985 to 1988 (then with the National Coalition Party), and as a member of the council of the city of Porvoo since 1996.

References

External links
Parliament of Finland: Pirkko Ruohonen-Lerner 
Home page 

1957 births
Living people
People from Hyvinkää
Finns Party politicians
Members of the Parliament of Finland (2007–11)
Members of the Parliament of Finland (2011–15)
Finns Party MEPs
MEPs for Finland 2014–2019
21st-century women MEPs for Finland
Women members of the Parliament of Finland